Mylėk (eng. "love") is the debut studio album by Lithuanian singer Vilija Matačiūnaitė. The album was released on 27 October 2006 through the label Hitas.

In 2005, she achieved wide recognition by participating in the Eurovision Song Contest-preselection and in the first season of a successful local LNK television music competition franchise Kelias į žvaigždes, where she became the runner-up. In 2006 she also hosted in a national radio station "Lietus" and eventually promoted her debut album.

Commercial performance
The album reached "platinum" status in Lithuania.

Track listing
The album includes studio versions of seven songs, that were already performed in Kelias į žvaigždes. Five songs were new compositions.

References 

2006 debut albums